The Dreese's Covered Bridge is located in Beaver Township, Snyder County, Pennsylvania. The  wooden covered bridge is located northeast of Beavertown and spans Middle Creek. It was built around 1870 and rehabilitated in 2001. The road bypassed the bridge in 1979 and the bridge is open to pedestrian traffic only. It is designed as a covered burr arch-truss. Total length is 95 feet. This bridge was added to the National Register of Historic Places on August 10, 1979.

References

External links 
VisitPA.com
Pennsylvania Covered Bridges, photos
Dreese's Covered Bridge at Historic Bridges of the United States

Bridges completed in 1870
Covered bridges in Snyder County, Pennsylvania
Former road bridges in the United States
Pedestrian bridges in Pennsylvania
Covered bridges on the National Register of Historic Places in Pennsylvania
Bridges in Snyder County, Pennsylvania
Tourist attractions in Snyder County, Pennsylvania
Wooden bridges in Pennsylvania
National Register of Historic Places in Snyder County, Pennsylvania
Road bridges on the National Register of Historic Places in Pennsylvania
Burr Truss bridges in the United States